WiLife, Inc. was founded in 2002 by Evan Tree and Andrew Hartsfield. The company developed a PC-based digital video surveillance system for residential and light commercial use. Their first product, LukWerks, was a mix of PC software, cameras, HomePlug technology and online services. The idea was to make it easy for any home or small business owner to set up their own professional video surveillance system.

WiLife was acquired by Logitech in November 2007.

References

External links
 Official web site

Defunct computer companies of the United States
Computer companies established in 2002
Computer companies disestablished in 2007
2002 establishments in Utah
2007 mergers and acquisitions
Logitech